Giovanni Battista (Giambattista) Foggini (25 April 1652 – 12 April 1725) was an Italian sculptor active in Florence, renowned mainly for small bronze statuary.

Biography
Born in Florence, the young Foggini was sent to Rome by the Medici Grand Duke of Tuscany to join the so-called Accademia Fiorentina, and apprentice in the Roman sculptural studio of Ercole Ferrata, a pupil of Algardi. He was also tutored in drawing by the Accademia's first director (1673–86), Ciro Ferri, who was a pupil of Cortona. Returning to Florence in 1676, he became the court sculptor for Cosimo III.

After the son of Pietro Tacca, Fernando, died in 1686, the mantle of the premier local sculptor fell to Foggini, who would become the Medici's Architetto Primario e Primo scultore della Casa Serenissima as well as Soprintendente dei Lavori (1687–1725). In 1687, Foggini acquired the foundry in Borgo Pinti that had once belonged to the sculptor Giambologna. This allowed him to specialize in small bronzes, produced mainly and profitably for export. His adaptation of Pietro Tacca's Moors was the basis of bronze and ceramic reproductions for the connoisseur market well into the 18th century.

In Florence, his masterpieces are his sculptural relief work in the Capella Corsini of the Chiesa del Carmine. The chapel was erected by Bartolomeo and Cardinal Neri Corsini in memory of their recently canonized ancestral family member, San Andrea Corsini. It contains three large marble reliefs depicting his life: San Andrea in Glory, The Mass of San Andrea Corsini and The Battle of Anghiari (1685–87). He also completed works in Cappella Feroni in the Annunziata. Another work is the main staircase of the Medici-Riccardi Palace in Florence.

Among his small bronzes are David with the Head of Goliath.

Foggini's pupils included Fernando Fuga, his nephew Filippo della Valle, Balthasar Permoser, Giovacchino Fortini and Giovanni Baratta. Massimiliano Soldani Benzi was a contemporary student with Foggini in Rome and also active in small bronze sculpture.

Gallery

Notes

External links

 Gli Ultimi Medici, Review by Peter Cannon-Brookes, in The Burlington Magazine, 1974, p 777-80.

1652 births
1725 deaths
Sculptors from Florence
17th-century Italian sculptors
Italian male sculptors
18th-century Italian sculptors
Court sculptors
18th-century Italian male artists